Happy Independent School District is a public school district based in Happy, Texas (USA).

Located in Swisher County, portions of the district extend into Randall, Armstrong, and Castro counties.

In 2009, the school district was rated "recognized" by the Texas Education Agency.

History
The district changed to a mixed schedule in fall 2022, in which class is not held on either a Monday or a Friday.

Schools
Happy High School (Grades 7-12)
Happy Elementary (Grades K-6)

References

External links
Happy ISD

School districts in Swisher County, Texas
School districts in Randall County, Texas
School districts in Armstrong County, Texas
School districts in Castro County, Texas